Morton Richard Browne (19 April 1908 – 3 September 1995) was an Australian rules footballer who played with Footscray in the Victorian Football League (VFL).

Notes

External links 

1908 births
1995 deaths
Australian rules footballers from Melbourne
Western Bulldogs players
People from Carlton, Victoria